Desulfococcus oleovorans is a bacterium from the genus Desulfococcus which has been isolated from mud from an oilfield near Hamburg in Germany.

Strain Hxd3
Desulfococcus oleovorans dtrain Hxd3 was isolated from the saline water phase of an oil-water separator from a northern German oil field.   Hxd3 is a delta-proteobacterium capable of utilizing C12-C20 alkanes as growth substrates.  Hxd3 activates alkanes via carboxylation at C3, with subsequent elimination of the terminal and subterminal carbons, yielding a fatty acid that is one carbon shorter than the parent alkane.   Hxd3 is the only pure culture that is known to carboxylate aliphatic hydrocarbons.

The genome of Desulfococcus oleovorans has been completely sequenced by the Joint Genome Institute.  Sequencing is paid for by a Department of Energy grant to Boris Wawrik et al. at Rutgers University.

References

External links
More information about the genome of strain Hxd3 can be found at : https://web.archive.org/web/20110721130135/http://www.meta-genome.net/Hxd3/

Further reading 
 
 
 
 

Desulfobacterales
Bacteria described in 1991